= Journal of Environmental Biology =

- Discipline: Environmental sciences, toxicology
- Language: English
- Edited by: R.C. Dalela

Publication details
- History: 1980–present
- Publisher: Triveni Enterprises (India)
- Frequency: Bimonthly
- Open access: Yes
- Impact factor: 0.781 (2019)

Standard abbreviations
- ISO 4: J. Environ. Biol.

Indexing
- CODEN: JEBIDP
- ISSN: 0254-8704 (print); 2394-0379 (web)
- OCLC no.: 613324928

Links
- Journal homepage

The Journal of Environmental Biology is a bimonthly peer-reviewed scientific journal published by Triveni Enterprises. It covers all aspects of environmental sciences, toxicology, and related fields. The editor-in-chief is R.C. Dalela, who started the journal in 1980.

== Publication ==
Print-issues are published bimonthly (January, March, May, July, September, November) and almost immediately after that, the contents are also published online with free access.

== Impact factor ==
According to the Journal Citation Reports, the journal has a 2011 impact factor of 0.640, ranking it 180th out of 205 journals in the category "Environmental Sciences".
